Tess Taylor (born October 24, 1977) is an American poet, academic, and a contributor to CNN and NPR.

Early life and education 
Taylor was born and raised in El Cerrito, California, and attended Berkeley High School. She earned a Bachelor of Arts degree in English and urban studies from Amherst College, a Master of Arts in journalism from New York University, and a Master of Fine Arts in creative writing and poetry Boston University.

Career 
Taylor is the author of a chapbook and four full-length collections of poetry.

Her chapbook, The Misremembered World, was selected by Eavan Boland for the Poetry Society of America's inaugural chapbook fellowship.

Her first book, The Forage House, was published in 2013 by Red Hen Press. In this book, Taylor, a white descendant of Thomas Jefferson, reckons with this heritage. In gathering materials for this book, Taylor received funding from the American Antiquarian Society and the International Center for Jefferson Studies to conduct research over two summers at Monticello, the primary plantation of Thomas Jefferson. Former Poet laureate of the United States Natasha Trethewey remarked that "The Forage House is a brave and compelling collection that bears witness to the journey of historical discovery. Sifting through archives, artifact, and souvenir, Taylor presents a dialectic of what's recorded and what's not, unearthing the traces that give way to her own history—and a vital link to our shared American past. What's here and accounted for draws us powerfully toward what's absent; what seems complete here never is—something as fragmented as history in the language, as haunted too."

Taylor's second book, Work & Days, features a calendric cycle of 28 poems which chart the work of a year spent interning on a small farm in The Berkshires while on an Amy Clampitt Fellowship in 2010. Work & Days was named one of the best books of poetry of 2016 by The New York Times.

In 2020, Taylor published Last West: Roadsongs for Dorothea Lange and Rift Zone. Last West: Roadsongs for Dorothea Lange was published by the Museum of Modern Art as a part of the Dorothea Lange: Words & Pictures exhibition. Rift Zone, published by Red Hen Press, is a book of poetry that explores fault lines, history, and current crises in Taylor's hometown of El Cerrito, California and across the state. Rift Zone was named as one of the best books of 2020 by The Boston Globe.

Taylor's writing has been published widely, appearing in magazines and journals such as Poetry, Tin House, The Kenyon Review, Virginia Quarterly Review, The New Yorker, Travel + Leisure, The Atlantic, Harper's Magazine, and many others. She is a frequent contributor to CNN and is the on-air poetry reviewer for NPR's All Things Considered.

In addition to her writing, Taylor has taught literature and writing at universities both in the U.S. and abroad, including Whittier College, UC Berkeley, Randolph College, Ashland University and Queen's University Belfast in Northern Ireland.

Personal life 
Taylor lives in El Cerrito, California, with her husband and two children.

Awards and fellowships 
 2003 Poetry Society of America's inaugural chapbook fellowship.
 2010 Amy Clampitt Fellowship
 2017 Distinguished Fulbright US Scholar at the Seamus Heaney Centre at Queen's University in Belfast

Books 
 The Misremembered World (Poetry Society of America, 2003)
 The Forage House (Red Hen Press, 2013)
 Work & Days (Red Hen Press, 2016)
 Last West: Roadsongs for Dorothea Lange (Museum of Modern Art, 2020)
 Rift Zone (Red Hen Press, 2020)

References 

American women poets
1977 births
Living people
21st-century American poets
People from El Cerrito, California
People from Contra Costa County, California
Berkeley High School (Berkeley, California) alumni
Amherst College alumni
New York University alumni
Boston University alumni
Whittier College faculty
Randolph College faculty
University of California, Berkeley faculty
American women academics
21st-century American women writers